Henry Crown (June 13, 1896 – August 14, 1990) was an American industrialist and philanthropist. Among other things, he founded the Material Service Corporation, which merged with General Dynamics in 1959. At the time of his death, he was a billionaire. Henry Crown and Company, of which he is the namesake, is an investment firm that owns or has interests in a variety of business assets. From 1951 to 1961, he was the owner of the Empire State Building.

Early life and career
Crown (birth name: Henry Krinsky) was born in 1896 to Jewish immigrants from Lithuania. He was the third of seven children of a sweatshop worker, Arie Krinsky (1861–1937), and his wife Ida (1871–1956) . His father changed the family name to Crown while Henry was a boy. Crown did not attend school past the eighth grade. In 1915, at the age of 19, he and his elder brother Sol founded S. R. Crown & Company, a steel broker.

Sol later died of tuberculosis, and in 1919, his brother Irving joined him. In the same year, he and his brother borrowed $10,000 and founded the Material Service Corporation (MSC). MSC sold gravel, sand, lime, and coal to builders in the Chicago area. In its first year, the company made a profit of $7,000 on sales of $218,000. He left the business to serve as a lieutenant colonel in the Army Corps of Engineers during World War II.

In 1959, Crown gained a controlling interest in General Dynamics and merged the company with MSC, which had $100 million in sales. In 1960, Crown was named director of General Dynamics and then chairman of its executive committee, which lasted until 1966, when he was forced out by Roger Lewis through the redemption of Crown's controlling block of preferred stock. In 1970, Crown purchased sufficient stock to once again achieve a controlling interest in General Dynamics and quickly removed Roger Lewis, replacing him with David S. Lewis (no relation).

Philanthropy
According to his own claim, Crown had given away "nine figures" in his philanthropic pursuits by the time he turned 79. His beneficiaries included the University of Chicago, Brandeis University, Stanford University,  Northwestern University and the St. Lawrence University student investment fund. The Henry Crown Symphony Hall in Jerusalem is named after him.

Personal life
Crown was married twice. His first wife, Rebecca Kranz, died in 1943. His second wife was Gladys Kay. Crown had three children: Robert Crown (1921–1969), Lester Crown (born June 7, 1925) and John J. Crown (1929–1997), a Cook County judge.

See also
Arie Crown Theater
General Dynamics

References

External links
Overview of Henry Crown and Company
Aspen Institute biography

1896 births
1990 deaths
Businesspeople from Chicago
American people of Lithuanian-Jewish descent
Jewish American philanthropists
Philanthropists from Illinois
20th-century American philanthropists
Crown Family
20th-century American businesspeople
20th-century American Jews